Minister of Health and Social Services can refer to:

 Minister of Health and Community Services (Manitoba)
 Minister of Health and Social Services (Northern Ireland)
 Minister of Health and Social Services (Nunavut)
 Ministry of Health and Social Services (Quebec)